N. Abdul Khader (1932—2021) was an Indian politician who was Member of the Rajya Sabha from Tamil Nadu representing Tamil Maanila Congress from October 10, 1997 to July 29, 1998. He won in by-election held after disqualification of Valampuri John.

References 

1932 births
2021 deaths
Members of the Rajya Sabha
Tamil Nadu politicians